Robyn Ngaire Norton  (born 23 November 1955) is a New Zealand health researcher who is James Martin Fellow and Professor of Public Health at the University of New South Wales. Her research considers women and girls' health. She is the Founder of the George Institute for Global Health.

Early life and education 
Norton is from Canterbury, New Zealand. She has said that she grew up in a family committed to equity and social justice. Her time in high school coincided with the rise of second-wave feminism, and Norton became interested in women's health. She remained in New Zealand for her undergraduate studies, earning a master's degree at the University of Canterbury. During her master's programme she evaluated the ergonomics of kitchen design in New Zealand. She moved to the University of Sydney for a master's of public health. Norton remained at the University of Sydney for her doctoral research, where she studied cirrhosis of the liver in women. After completing her PhD research, Norton was a postdoctoral researcher at the Royal Free Hospital and National Institutes of Health.

Research and career 
Norton has focused her career to improving the health outcomes of women. In 1999, she founded the George Institute for Global Health, a non-profit which she continues to lead as Director. The institute seeks to understand the global burden of disease in lower and middle-income countries, improve the expertise of such countries in handling an epidemic and to emphasise the importance of maternal and child health. In 2011 the George Institute for Global Health was one of the world's top ten research institutions. The Institute works on non-communicable diseases, which are the leading cause of death for women worldwide.

Her research considers the causes, prevention and management of injuries. In this capacity, she serves as Chair of the Road Traffic Injuries Research Network.

Awards and honours 
 2016 Elected Fellow of the Australian Academy of Health and Medical Sciences
 2017 Officer of the Order of Australia
 Elected Fellow of the Royal Society of Medicine
 2019 The Australian Financial Review Australia’s Top Women of Influence

Selected publications

References 

1955 births
Living people
Women's health movement
Officers of the Order of Australia
Fellows of the Australian Academy of Health and Medical Sciences
People from Christchurch
New Zealand women scientists